Siagonium quadricorne is a species of rove beetles native to Europe.

References

Piestinae
Beetles described in 1815
Beetles of Europe